The 1946 United States Senate election in Montana took place on November 5, 1946. Incumbent United States Senator Burton K. Wheeler, who was first elected to the Senate in 1922, and was re-elected in 1928, 1934, and 1940, ran for re-election. He was challenged in the Democratic primary by Leif Erickson, the Chief Justice of the Montana Supreme Court, and, following a close election, was narrowly defeated by Erickson. In the general election, Erickson faced State Senator Zales Ecton, the Republican nominee. Ultimately, Ecton defeated Erickson by a fairly wide margin, winning his first and only term in the Senate. Another Republican would not be elected Senator from Montana until 42 years later, when Conrad Burns narrowly won the 1988 election.

Democratic primary

Candidates
Leif Erickson, Chief Justice of the Montana Supreme Court
Burton K. Wheeler, incumbent United States Senator

Results

Republican primary

Candidates
Zales Ecton, State Senator, former State Representative
R. E. Skeen

Results

General election

Results

References

Montana
1946
1946 Montana elections